Wesoła is a dzielnica (district) of Mysłowice, Silesian Voivodeship, southern Poland. In years 1962–1975 it was an independent town, but was in 1975 amalgamated with Mysłowice.

It has an area of 8,14 km2 and in 2012 had a population of 8,108.

History 
The settlement was first mentioned in 1710. In the War of the Austrian Succession most of Silesia was conquered by the Kingdom of Prussia, including the village. It was affected by industrial development beginning in the second half of the 18th century. After World War I in the Upper Silesia plebiscite 437 out of 452 voters in Wesoła voted in favour of joining Poland, against 15 opting for staying in Germany. The village became a part of autonomous Silesian Voivodeship in Second Polish Republic. It was then annexed by Nazi Germany at the beginning of World War II. After the war it was restored to Poland.

References

Neighbourhoods in Silesian Voivodeship
Mysłowice